The 61st Cyberspace Squadron (61 CYS) is a United States Space Force unit assigned to Space Operations Command's Space Delta 6. It provides information with regards to further protecting and adding additional layers of defense of space-based systems. It is headquartered at Schriever Space Force Base, Colorado.

See also 
 Space Delta 6

References

External links 
 

Military education and training in the United States
Squadrons of the United States Space Force